St. Joseph on the Brandywine, originally Saint Joseph's Church until St. Joseph's Church- Wilmington was built in 1947, is a parish of the Roman Catholic Church in Greenville, New Castle County, Delaware, in the Diocese of Wilmington. It is a historic parish church complex and national historic district located on Old Church Road. Since 2002 its old convent building has housed the diocesan archives, with records going back two centuries. It is also the home parish of the 46th President of the United States, Joe Biden.

Campus
The complex encompasses four buildings as well as a large parish cemetery. The main church is a stuccoed stone structure, painted yellow, with the pedimented gable of the facade pierced by the church's steeple. The other buildings consist of a rectory, convent, and former school.

The school was opened in 1853 and was originally staffed by the Sisters of St. Joseph, and later by the Order of St. Francis in 1887.

History

While there was a strong Catholic presence in the Wilmington area since 1813, Catholic masses were relegated to traveling priests at private homes and in the local manufacturing mills. Irish mills workers began petitioning the Diocese of Philadelphia for their own church in the region starting in the late 1830s. They were supported in their efforts by the Du Pont family, who contributed financial assets and political pressure to the establishment of the parish. The original church of St. Joseph was built in February 1841 by the Duponts for Irish and Italian Catholic workers at the C.I.DuPont de Nemours & Co. The land was originally granted by Charles I. du Pont, who also served on the original board of Trustees along with Alfred du Pont, Henry du Pont, Peter N. Brennan, Edward Dougherty, Charles Dougherty, and Michael Dougherty. The church itself was dedicated the following winter in December 1842 by Francis Kenrick, Bishop of Philadelphia.

Additions were made to the church structure in 1848 under Fr. John Walsh to accommodate 550 parishioners. In 1853, a house on the campus burned down and was rebuilt with the assistance of Amelia du Pont, who converted the building into a convent, thereafter inviting the Sisters of St. Joseph to occupy the grounds and open a parochial school through the parish. The parish school, which originally occupied the church basement, was moved in 1855 into its own building.

The parish house was destroyed in 1866 during a fire originating from the roof. The school was also shut down during this period as the Sisters of St. Joseph were recalled by James Frederick Wood, Archbishop of Philadelphia. The school would re-open under the direction of the sisters of the Order of St. Francis, as well as lay teachers from the parish. It would remain in operation under the sisters until the spring of 1972, when it was permanently shut down due to decreased attendance. The sisters have since vacated the campus to attend to their educational social mission elsewhere. Additional repairs and alterations to the church were made in 1878, 1941 and 1950, so much so that the present form displays very little of the original 1841 church structure. It was added to the National Register of Historic Places in 1976, a marker was placed on the campus in 2016 by the State of Delaware.

Rectors
Rev. Bernard E. McCabe, OSA: 1841–1842, previously built St. Malachi's Church in Coatesville (d. 1857) (killed after falling asleep while reading with a candle)
Rev. John Frost: 1842
Rev. Daniel Magorian: 1843-1846
Rev. John S. Walsh: 1846-1867
Rev. John Scanlan: 1867-1869
Rev. George J. Kelly: 1869-1887
Rev. Dennis J. Flynn (Assistant Pastor) 1883–1885, Later President of Mount St. Mary's College
Rev. Edward Henchy SJ: 1887–1893, formerly President of Loyola College in Maryland
Rev. Peter Donaghy: 1893, a native of Ireland and Gaelic-speaking priest, previously Assistant Pastor
Rev. John D. Carly: 1893-1895
Rev. George S. Bradford: 1895
Rev. William J. Bermingham OP: 1895-1900
Rev. William J. Scott: 1900-1926 (d. 1932)
Rev. Martin McHale Ryan: 1926-1933
Msgr. Patrick A. Brennan: 1933-1946 (d. 1950)
Msgr. Francis X. Fitzpatrick: 1946–1950, later Vicar of St. Peter's Church- New Castle (d. 1972)
Rev. Henry J. Dreyer: 1950-1966 (d. 1969)
Rev. John L. Noonan SSJ: 1952-? (Assistant Pastor)
Msgr. Henry I. Foltz: 1966-1977
Msgr. Paul J. Schierse, Jr.: 1977–1992, Canon Lawyer and Chancellor of the Diocese of Wilmington (d. 1998)
Rev. Peter P. Harney: 1990-1995 (Assistant Pastor)
Rev. Stephen J. Connell, Jr.: 1992-1997; (Assistant Pastor) 1962-1963
Rev. Joseph Wharton: (Assistant Pastor) 1994-1997
Msgr. Thomas Cini: 1997–1998, Previously Principal of St. Mark's High School and St. Elizabeth's High School
Rev. William Mathesius: (Assistant Pastor) 1997-1998
Rev. David F. Kelley: 1998-1999
Msgr. Joseph F. Rebman: 1999–2021
Rev. John O. Barres: (Assistant Pastor) 2001-?
Rev. Brian Lewis, (Assistant Pastor) 2018-2020
Rev. Glenn Evers, (Assistant Pastor'') 2020–2021
Msgr. John P. Hopkins: 2021–Present

Notable burials
Joseph R. Biden Sr., (1915-2002): Father of Joe Biden
Catherine Eugenia Finnegan Biden, (1917-2010): Mother of Joe Biden
Joseph R. Biden III, (1969-2015): 44th Attorney General of Delaware and son of Joe Biden and Neilia Biden
Naomi Christina Biden, (1971-1972): Daughter of Joe Biden and Neilia Biden
Neilia Hunter Biden, (1942-1972): First wife of Joe Biden
James Kalil, (1919-2014): American scientist who worked on the Manhattan Project
John McMahon, (1867-1954): professional baseball player for the Philadelphia Athletics and Baltimore Orioles
Joseph McManamon, (1919-2014): Cleveland Municipal Court Judge
Joseph Walsh, (1930-2014): Delaware Supreme Court Justice
Margaret Gwenver, (1926-2010): Stage and Soap Opera Actress

References

External links

St. Joseph Cemetery on Find a Grave

Churches in the Roman Catholic Diocese of Wilmington
Churches in New Castle County, Delaware
Churches on the National Register of Historic Places in Delaware
Historic American Buildings Survey in Delaware
Historic districts on the National Register of Historic Places in Delaware
National Register of Historic Places in New Castle County, Delaware
Roman Catholic churches completed in 1841
Religious organizations established in 1841
1841 establishments in Delaware
19th-century Roman Catholic church buildings in the United States